Meet the Wife was a 1923  three act Broadway comedy written by Lynn Starling and produced by Stewart and French, Inc. It ran for 232 performances from November 26, 1923 to June 1924 at the Klaw Theatre. Mary Boland starred as inadvertent bigamist Gertrude Lennox, Humphrey Bogart 
as the juvenile lead reporter Gregory Brown and Clifton Webb as sporting youngblood Victor Staunton. It was set in Gertrude Lennox's living room.

It was adapted as a feature film also titled Meet the Wife in 1931 starring Laura La Plante.

Cast
Mary Boland as Gertrude Lennox	
Charles Dalton as Harvey Lennox
Humphrey Bogart as Gregory Brown
Clifton Webb as Victor Staunton
Patricia Calvert as Alice	
Eleanor Griffith as Doris Bellamy	
Ernest Lawford as Philip Lord	
Charles Bloomer as William	
Ralph Glover

References

pic of Humphrey Bogart as Gregory Brown in 1923 Broadway play "Meet the Wife" with Patricia Calvert and Ralph Glover

External links
Meet the Wife (the film) at IMDb

1923 plays
Broadway plays
Comedy plays
American plays adapted into films
Plays set in the United States